Presidential elections were held in Ecuador on 30 and 31 October 1932. The result was a victory for Juan de Dios Martínez, who received 71% of the vote.

Results

References

Presidential elections in Ecuador
Ecuador
1932 in Ecuador
October 1932 events
Election and referendum articles with incomplete results